The Art Association of the Philippines (AAP) is an art organization that aims to "advance and foster, and promote the interests of those who work in the visual arts."

References

Arts in the Philippines
Clubs and societies in the Philippines
Arts organizations established in 1948
1948 establishments in the Philippines